Ian Bleasdale (born 1950, in Upholland, Lancashire) is an English actor and television presenter. He  divides his time between Haworth in West Yorkshire and Bristol. He started off life as a teacher before deciding that he wanted to become an actor, something which he would later joke forced his mother to take to her sickbed.

He has appeared in various programmes, including The Beiderbecke Affair, Harry's Game, Inspector Morse, The Brittas Empire, Andy Capp, Soldier Soldier, All Creatures Great and Small and as a photographer on Coronation Street.

However, Bleasdale is best known for his role as paramedic Josh Griffiths on the BBC television drama, Casualty. He was the second longest serving character in the show's 20-year history, bettered only by Derek Thompson's character Charlie Fairhead. Since 2016 Bleasdale has made several guest stints in the show and in 2017 his character was made ambulance station manager.

Josh first appeared in episode 1 of series 4 (1989) and started as a speaking extra. His role has gone from strength to strength over the years and he has had several harrowing storylines so far, including the death of his family in a house fire, and his second wife Collette having an affair with a colleague and finally leaving him. He left the show on 3 November 2007 after 18 years. He took part in the 2009 series of Celebrity MasterChef. He appeared for a short part in one of the last episodes of The Bill. In 2013 he made appearances in Doctors and Law & Order UK. Since leaving Casualty, Bleasdale has been presenting the BBC1 show Hospital Heroes.

References

External links

1952 births
English male television actors
Living people
People from Up Holland
People educated at Balshaw's Grammar School